The Ice Rink is a 1998 comedy film written and directed by Jean-Philippe Toussaint. It stars Tom Novembre, Mireille Perrier, Dolores Chaplin, Marie-France Pisier, Jean-Pierre Cassel, Gilbert Melki, and Bruce Campbell.

Cast
 Tom Novembre as Director
 Mireille Perrier as Assistant
 Marie-France Pisier as Producer
 Bruce Campbell as Actor
 Dolores Chaplin as Actress
 Jean-Pierre Cassel as Ice Rink's Manager
 Gilbert Melki as Stand-in for Actress

Production
The film was shot in Franconville, a suburb of Paris, France.

Reception
Stephen Holden of The New York Times wrote of the film: "If its pieces don't completely fit, The Ice Rink has sophisticated comic performances by a cast who know their characters well enough to make us like them in spite of their self-absorption."

References

External links
 
 

1998 films
1998 comedy films
French comedy films
Italian comedy films
Belgian comedy films
1990s French-language films
Films shot in Paris
French-language Belgian films
1990s French films